The Treaty of Whitehall (or the Treaty of American Neutrality) was signed between Louis XIV of France and James II of England on 26 November 1686 (16 November O.S.).   They agreed that a European conflict would not disrupt peace and neutrality in New France and New England and declared that "though the two Countries might be at war in Europe their Colonies in America should continue in peace and Neutrality." The treaty specifically prohibited each nation from fishing or trading in the other's territory and each power from aiding Indian tribes who might be at war with the other.

The treaty was short-lived, however, and was broken following the outbreak of King William's War in 1689, the first in the series of French and Indian Wars.

References

Sources
 
 

European colonization of the Americas
New France
British North America
1686 in France
1686 in the British Empire
1686 treaties
Treaties of France
Treaties of England
England–France relations